The Constant Gardener is a 2005 drama thriller film directed by Fernando Meirelles. The screenplay by Jeffrey Caine is based on  John le Carré's 2001 novel of the same name. The story follows Justin Quayle (Ralph Fiennes), a British diplomat in Kenya, as he tries to solve the murder of his wife Tessa (Rachel Weisz), an Amnesty activist, alternating with many flashbacks telling the story of their love.

The film was filmed on location in Loiyangalani and the slums of Kibera, a section of Nairobi, Kenya. Circumstances in the area affected the cast and crew to the extent that they set up the Constant Gardener Trust in order to provide basic education for these villages. The plot was vaguely based on a real-life case in Kano, Nigeria. The DVD versions were released in the United States on 1 January 2006 and in the United Kingdom on 13 March 2006. Justin's gentle but diligent attention to his plants is a recurring background theme, from which image the film's title is derived. Hubert Koundé, Danny Huston, Bill Nighy, Pete Postlethwaite, and Donald Sumpter co-star. The film was a critical and box office success and earned four Oscar nominations, winning Best Supporting Actress for Rachel Weisz.

Plot
Justin Quayle, a British diplomat and avid horticulturalist, is confronted by Amnesty International activist Tessa during a lecture in London. They strike up a romance, and marry after she accompanies him to his posting in Kenya, where she befriends Belgian doctor Arnold Bluhm, leading to rumors of an affair. Tessa has no qualms confronting corruption, to the chagrin of Justin's superiors, and they lose a child late in her pregnancy.

Connecting local deaths to trials of a new drug, Dypraxa, conducted by Kenyan-based company Three Bees, Tessa and Arnold write a damaging report on the drug. She gives it to Justin's colleague Sandy Woodrow, the British High Commissioner, who sends it to Sir Bernard Pellegrin, head of the Africa Desk at the Foreign Office. Pellegrin responds with an incriminating letter to Sandy, which Tessa persuades him to show her, and she steals it before departing for Loki with Arnold.

Sandy informs Justin that a white woman and black driver have been killed near Lake Turkana, and that Tessa and Arnold shared a room at Lodwar before hiring a car. Justin and Sandy identify Tessa's mutilated body, but Arnold's whereabouts remain unknown. Police confiscate Tessa's computer and files, but Justin finds her keepsake box, containing a letter from Sandy declaring his love for her and asking her to return Pellegrin's letter, and records of Three Bees' tests.

After Tessa's burial, Justin learns from his colleague Ghita that Tessa kept Arnold's secret that he was gay, as homosexuality is illegal in Kenya. Pursuing the truth about his wife's murder, Justin follows the trail of her report. He is briefly detained by police and confronts Three Bees' CEO Kenny Curtis, but receives no answers.

Returning to London, Justin's passport is confiscated. He dines with Pellegrin, who lies that Arnold must have murdered Tessa, and believes that Justin has his incriminating letter. Justin meets with Tessa's cousin and lawyer Ham, and they access her computer files to reveal her investigation into Dypraxa and its manufacturer, pharmaceutical conglomerate KDH, who hired Three Bees to test the drug on unsuspecting Kenyans.

Justin receives a threatening note, and Ham provides him with a fake passport to travel to Germany, where he meets Tessa's contact Birgit, part of a pharmaceutical watchdog group. The group has been targeted and she is reluctant to speak, and Justin is attacked in his hotel room and warned to stop investigating. Arnold's body is found tortured to death, while the announcement of a safe Dypraxa causes KDH's stock price to soar.

Returning to Kenya, Justin confronts Sandy, who admits that Tessa's report was silenced to save KDH from spending millions redeveloping the drug. Justin is approached by Curtis, who has been betrayed by KDH, and brought to a mass grave of Dypraxa test subjects. Curtis points Justin to Dr Lorbeer, Dypraxa's inventor, who has fled to Sudan. Tim Donohue, a friend in British intelligence, confirms that Pellegrin had Tessa and Arnold killed. Unable to convince Justin to return home, he gives him a gun.

Justin travels to confront Lorbeer, who is treating remote villagers to atone for the lives claimed by his drug. The village is attacked by raiders, but Justin and Lorbeer escape in a U.N. aid plane, and Lorbeer reveals that he has Pellegrin's letter; Tessa convinced him to record the truth about Dypraxa, but he changed his mind, informing KDH that Tessa and Arnold were en route to expose the company to the U.N.

Justin convinces the pilot to mail Pellegrin's letter to Ham, and to drop him off at Lake Turkana. Removing the bullets from his gun, his final thoughts are of Tess before he is killed by KDH's henchmen. In London at Tessa and Justin's memorial service, Pellegrin lies that Justin committed suicide in the same place his wife died. Ham announces the reading of an epistle, but instead reads Pellegrin's letter, exposing the deaths caused by Dypraxa and the subsequent coverup. Pellegrin storms out as Ham implicates the British government, KDH, and public complacency regarding the human cost of medicine they take for granted.

Cast

Inspiration and themes
The plot of the film is loosely based on a real-life case in Kano, Nigeria involving antibacterial testing by Pfizer on small children.

The film's title derives from Justin's gentle but diligent attention to his plants, a recurring background theme that informs his patience and persistence.

Production

The film was shot partly in 16mm on location in Loiyangalani and the slums of Kibera, a section of Nairobi, Kenya. Circumstances in the area so affected the cast and crew that the Constant Gardener Trust was established in 2004 in order to thank the community for their help during filming.

Kate Winslet was considered for the female lead before Weisz was cast.

Reception

Box office
The film's worldwide gross was $82,466,670.

Critical response
The consensus reads, "The Constant Gardener is a smart, gripping, and suspenseful thriller with rich performances from the leads." It also has a score of 82 out of 100 on Metacritic, based on 39 critics, indicating "universal acclaim". Audiences polled by CinemaScore gave the film an average grade of "B" on an A+ to F scale.

Roger Ebert of the Chicago Sun-Times called it "one of the year's best films." USA Today noted that the film's "passion, betrayal, gorgeous cinematography, social commentary, stellar performances and clever wit puts it in a special category near perfection". However, Michael Atkinson of The Village Voice criticized the film as "a cannonballing mélange of hack-cuts, impressionistic close-ups, and tropical swelter."

Accolades

Author's dedication and afterword
John le Carré, in the first edition of the 2001 novel on which the film is based, provided both a dedication and a personal afterword. The dedication and part of the afterword (amended) are reproduced in the closing credits of the film. The first states: "This film is dedicated to Yvette Pierpaoli and all other aid workers who lived and died giving a damn." The latter continues (in the next credit): "Nobody in this story, and no outfit or corporation, thank God, is based upon an actual person or outfit in the real world. But I can tell you this. As my journey through the pharmaceutical jungle progressed, I came to realize that, by comparison with the reality, my story was as tame as a holiday postcard." The text appears over John le Carré's name.

See also

 Abdullahi v. Pfizer, Inc.
 Medicine Man

References

External links 

 
 
 
 

2005 films
2000s thriller drama films
2000s mystery thriller films
2000s mystery drama films
BAFTA winners (films)
British mystery thriller films
British nonlinear narrative films
British thriller drama films
English-language German films
Films about murder
Films about widowhood
Films directed by Fernando Meirelles
Films featuring a Best Supporting Actress Academy Award-winning performance
Films featuring a Best Supporting Actress Golden Globe-winning performance
Films set in Kenya
Films set in London
Films set in Sudan
Films shot in Kenya
Focus Features films
2005 independent films
Films based on works by John le Carré
Films scored by Alberto Iglesias
Medical-themed films
Films with screenplays by Jeffrey Caine
2005 drama films
Films set in Nairobi
Films shot in 16 mm film
2000s English-language films
2000s British films